The Sumathi Best Television Presenter Award is presented annually in Sri Lanka by the Sumathi Group of Campany associated with many commercial brands for the best Sri Lankan presenter of the year in television screen.

The award was first given in 2002, under the title best announcer. In 2009, the award was separated for two as Best Announcer and Best Presenter. Following is a list of the winners of this prestigious title since then.

Awards

References

Awards established in 2002
2002 establishments in Sri Lanka